Merry Madagascar is a Christmas special first broadcast on the NBC network on November 17, 2009, which starred the characters from the film series Madagascar, and takes place sometime between the first and second film. It is the second DreamWorks Animation Christmas special, after Shrek the Halls.

It features many of the same voices from the film (except Sacha Baron Cohen, who was replaced by Danny Jacobs, the voice of Julien in both The Penguins of Madagascar and All Hail King Julien television series), including Ben Stiller, Chris Rock, David Schwimmer, and Jada Pinkett Smith. Carl Reiner provided the voice of Santa Claus.

Plot
Taking place a few months after the events of the first film and before the events of the second film, Alex, Marty, Melman, and Gloria attempt to return to New York City in a hot air balloon. However, the lemur population inadvertently thwarts their escape by mistaking them for the "Marauding Red Night Goblin" that visits annually. The "Goblin" then showers the island with coals. Alex shoots it down, discovering it was actually Santa Claus throwing coal at Julien for being naughty.

The crash leaves Santa with amnesia, unaware of his responsibilities. The group resolve to deliver the presents and use the sleigh to get back home, but Santa's reindeer won't take orders from anyone other than Santa, so the penguins use Santa's magic dust to fly.

Their initial attempts to make deliveries go awry so they decide to dump the gifts at the relevant post offices. However, after crashing into an apartment and unintentionally bringing joy to a little girl, they continue with the deliveries despite the adverse conditions.

Back on Madagascar, while the lemurs are presenting gifts to Julien for "Julianuary", Santa rediscovers his ability to make toys. He crafts gifts for them all, angering Julien as he feels the focus should be on him. Julien decrees that the lemurs' gifts belong to him. Sifting through the presents alone depresses him; Santa's suggestion of giving a gift lifts his mood.

As the night nears its end, the animals have only enough magic dust for one last trip. Putting aside their desire to go home, they return to Madagascar to rescue Santa. They run out of dust and crash into him, restoring his memory. He thanks the animals for making his deliveries and takes Julien off the naughty list. However, the animals have overlooked a bag for Liechtenstein, so Santa switches to a reserve tank to make the trip before the animals can ask for a ride. The animals resolve to enjoy their Christmas in Madagascar, but Julien throws a coconut at Alex to get back on the naughty list, causing a lump on his head and amnesia, like Santa before him.

Cast
 Ben Stiller as Alex the lion.
 Chris Rock as Marty the zebra.
 David Schwimmer as Melman the giraffe.
 Jada Pinkett Smith as Gloria the hippopotamus.
 Danny Jacobs as King Julien XIII the ring-tailed lemur.
 Tom McGrath as Skipper the penguin.
 Chris Miller as Kowalski the penguin.
 Christopher Knights as Private the penguin.
 Carl Reiner as Santa Claus.
 Cedric the Entertainer as Maurice the aye-aye.
 Andy Richter as Mort the mouse lemur.
 Nina Dobrev as Cupid the reindeer.
 Willow Smith as Abby.
 Jim Cummings as Donner, the lead reindeer.

Note: Rico appears, but has no dialogue.

Awards
Merry Madagascar was nominated for six Annie Awards, and won one award for Storyboarding in a Television Production.

Home media
Merry Madagascar was released on DVD in the United States on November 18, 2009, exclusively at stores of Walmart, and it was widely released on October 11, 2011. The special was released on Blu ray and DVD on October 30, 2012, as part of compilation titled Dreamworks Holiday Classics. It was re released on DVD on October 1, 2013 along with Shrek the Halls, Kung Fu Panda Holiday, Dragons: Gift of the Night Fury, and The Croods.

Partnership 
In July 2011, as part of a strategic partnership between DreamWorks Animation and Gaylord Hotels, Merry Madagascar was presented as the theme of the ICE! exhibit at Gaylord's hotels in Nashville and Maryland. In this presentation, the plot of the film is told through a series of ice sculptures that visitors walk past.

References

External links

 

2009 television specials
NBC television specials
American television films
Christmas television specials
DreamWorks Animation animated short films
2009 short films
2000s American animated films
Madagascar (franchise)
American Christmas television specials
Animated Christmas television specials
2000s animated television specials
Films scored by Heitor Pereira
Films directed by David Soren (animator)
2009 films